Košice is a municipality and village in Tábor District in the South Bohemian Region of the Czech Republic. It has about 800 inhabitants.

Administrative parts
Villages of Borek and Doubí are administrative parts of Košice.

References

Villages in Tábor District